Ānandavardhana (c. 820–890 CE) was the author of Dhvanyāloka, or A Light on Suggestion (dhvani), a work articulating the philosophy of "aesthetic suggestion" (dhvani, vyañjanā). The philosopher Abhinavagupta (c. 950 – 1016 CE) wrote an important commentary on it, the Locana, or The Eye.

Ānandavardhana is credited with creating the dhvani theory. He wrote that dhvani (meaning sound, or resonance) is the "soul" or "essence" (ātman) of poetry (kavya)." "When the poet writes," said Ānandavardhana, "he creates a resonant field of emotions."  To understand the poetry, the reader or hearer must be on the same "wavelength."  The method requires sensitivity on the parts of the writer and the reader. The complete Dhvanyāloka together with Abhinavagupta's commentary on it has been translated into English by the Sanskritist Daniel H.H. Ingalls and his collaborators.

Assessment by Modern Sanskritists
Modern Sanskritists have a very high opinion of Ānandavardhana. Commenting on Ānandavardhana's Dhvanyaloka, P.V. Kane writes that  "the Dhvanyāloka is an epoch-making work in the history of Alaṅkāra literature. It occupies the same position in poetics as Pāṇini's Aṣtādhyāyī in grammar and Śaṅkarācarya's commentary on Vedānta". And Daniel H.H. Ingalls calls Ānandavardhana 'the most brilliant of all Sanskrit critics'.

References

External links 
The Dhvanyaloka of Anandavardhana with the Locana of Abhinavagupta (for purchase only).
Revised GRETIL e-text (untranslated) of the Dhvanyāloka, based on the edition by K. Krishnamoorthy, Delhi: Motilal Banarsidass, 1982.

9th-century Indian philosophers
9th-century Indian poets
Kashmiri people
Kashmiri writers
820s births
890 deaths
Indian male poets
Scholars from Jammu and Kashmir

The three types of poems dhwani kavya ,gunibhuta vangiya kavya ,chitra kavya are explained by Anandha vardhana . Dhvani kavya is the best poetry,Gunibhuta vangiya kavya is second class and third or low class is Chitra kavya.